The Vow is an American true crime documentary series directed by Jehane Noujaim and Karim Amer that revolves around the cult NXIVM and its leader Keith Raniere. The NXIVM documentary series premiered on August 23, 2020 on HBO.

In October 2020, the series was renewed for a second season, which premiered on October 17, 2022.

Premise
The Vow follows members who joined the self-improvement group NXIVMwhose leader, Keith Raniere, was convicted of sex trafficking and racketeering conspiracy, among other crimesand reveals the emotional toll of unfolding events, as well as the role actress Allison Mack played in recruiting new members. In the first season, former NXIVM members Sarah Edmondson, Mark Vicente, Bonnie Piesse, Anthony "Nippy" Ames, Barbara Bouchey, Susan Dones and Toni Natalie appear prominently, alongside Frank Parlato, who helped start initial reporting on the criminal activity of NXIVM, and New York Times reporter Barry Meier. Catherine Oxenberg appears in the series as she attempts to rescue her daughter India Oxenberg, a story at the center of another docuseries, Seduced: Inside the NXIVM Cult.

The second season of the series focuses on Raniere's trial and takes a continued look inside his inner circle and at ongoing supporters through interviews with co-founder Nancy Salzman and her daughter, Michelle Salzman, former NXIVM members Karen Unterreiner, Isabella Constantino and Verónica Jaspeado, New York Post journalist Emily Saul, lead prosecutor Moira Kim Penza, defense attorney Marc Agnifilo and supporters Nicki Clyne, Marc Elliot, Michele Hatchette, and Eduardo Aunsolo.

Production
In 2007, Jehane Noujaim took a NXIVM course after being recruited by Sara Bronfman. Noujaim previously wanted to make a documentary about NXIVM, after hearing about people's lives being changed within days, but was unable to get the access she needed to make the film. Noujaim returned to finish her courses in 2017, where she was told about abuses within the organization and began documenting alongside Karim Amer.  Editors on the project suggested Noujaim participate as a subject in the series; however, since she only took two weeks of classes compared to other participants in the series, she felt it would not be right. Noujaim and Amer planned to split the story into two parts, with the first part focusing on those who left the cult and the second focusing on legal aspects. With the second season set to be its last, Noujaim has expressed interest in making a third season or a special focusing on the organization in Mexico, as majority of members were from Mexico.

Production on the series began in 2017, initially focusing on Sarah Edmondson, Mark Vicente, Bonnie Piesse, Anthony Ames, and Catherine Oxenberg as a way to document their escape from NXIVM as they were fearful of being sued by Clare Bronfman, and wanted to protect themselves by having it taped. The series was shot using Cinéma vérité, with all involved in the project unsure what would happen to NXIVM and Raniere. Oxenberg filmed with Noujaim and Amer for a year-and-a-half before reuniting with her daughter, India Oxenberg, whom she attempts to rescue throughout the first season. Oxenberg decided to split from the production in fear her daughter would not reunite with her with cameras around. India Oxenberg decided not to participate in the series as she was not ready at the time of production to share her story to any outlet; she later did in Seduced, which focuses on her story as told by her and her mother. Cult expert Janja Lalich served as a consultant on the series.

The series additionally features archive footage and recordings of Keith Raniere, Nancy Salzman, Lauren Salzman, Clare Bronfman, Sara Bronfman, Emiliano Salinas, Nicki Clyne, and Marc Elliot, among others, which were shot by Vicente as part of NXIVM's plan to document Raniere and how "wise" he was 24/7 for "future generations".

In April 2019, it was announced the series had been greenlit by HBO, with HBO Documentary Films producing.

In September 2020, in an interview with Variety Noujaim stated "We reached out to everybody involved — many people, on all sides of the story — and we are continuing to film." On October 16, 2020, HBO renewed the series for a second season. For the second season, Noujaim directed the season without Karim Amer, who departed to focus on other projects but remained an executive producer. Noujaim wanted to interview all involved in NXIVM including its founder Nancy Salzman, who took a year to decide to participate in the series, to show a 360-view of an "eco-system of manipulation".

Episodes

Season 1 (2020)

Season 2 (2022)

Reception

Critical response
On Rotten Tomatoes, the first season holds an approval rating of 72% based on 29 reviews, with an average rating of 7.6/10. The website's critics consensus reads, "Though The Vows scope at times exceeds its reach, its empathetic approach to unpacking NXIVM's manipulations and the consequences thereof make for necessary, difficult viewing."
On Metacritic, the series has a weighted average score of 76 out of 100, based on 15 critics, indicating "generally favorable reviews".

In year-end best of 2020 television and documentary lists, The Vow found itself on the lists of The Washington Post, The Los Angeles Times, Entertainment Weekly, Variety, Thrillist, Concrete Playground, and The Lineup. A number of reviews praised The Vow'''s intimate exploration, measured pace and extensive footage, but criticized its abstract storytelling and focus. In a positive review, Adrian Horton of The Guardian wrote that "as a portrait of manipulation and, in particular, the masking of female abuse through self-effacement, the series is darkly compelling, unnerving in a way that’s hard to shake," but conceded "[it] deceptively muddies the timeline of the group’s development." Varietys Daniel D'Addario wrote that "The Vow pushes back against its slack pace to become television that compels — both for the access it has and for what it does with that access." Richard Lawson writing in Vanity Fair, was critical stating: "The Vow meanders through the downward arc of a cult’s fall, but gives us little sense of its history." The A.V. Clubs Ashley Ray-Harris was less impressed and attributed the "wasted nine hours" and selective content to the (former NXIVM) filmmakers' desire to "get ahead of the curve with their own narrative." Maureen Ryan of the New York Times, in an otherwise positive review described the series as "only scratch[ing] the surface" and  "padded... repetitive."

On Rotten Tomatoes, the second season has an approval rating of 67% based on 9 reviews, with an average rating of 2.6/10. On Metacritic, the season has a weighted average score of 79 out of 100, based on 4 critics, indicating "generally favorable reviews".

Accolades

Ratings
Season 1

Season 2

See alsoThe Lost Women of NXIVM, Investigation Discovery showSeduced: Inside the NXIVM Cult'', Starz series
 Ages of consent in North America

Notes

References

External links
 
 

2020s American documentary television series
2020 American television series debuts
2022 American television series endings
English-language television shows
HBO original programming
True crime television series
Television series about cults
NXIVM